Boletoglyphus is a genus of mites in the family Acaridae.

Species
 Boletoglyphus cribrosus Volgin, 1953
 Boletoglyphus boletophagi (Türk, 1952)
 Boletoglyphus ornatus Fain & Ide, 1976
 Boletoglyphus extremiorientalis Klimov, 1998

References

Acaridae